This is a list of animated television series first aired 2019.

See also
2019 in animation
2019 in anime
List of animated feature films of 2019

Notes

References

2019
2019
Television series
2019-related lists